Saint-Maurice-aux-Forges is a commune in the Meurthe-et-Moselle department in north-eastern France.

Geography

Climate

Saint-Maurice-aux-Forges has a oceanic climate (Köppen climate classification Cfb).

See also
Communes of the Meurthe-et-Moselle department

References

Saintmauriceauxforges